A joint committee of the Parliament of the United Kingdom is a joint committee of the Parliament of the United Kingdom, formed to examine a particular issue, whose members are drawn from both the House of Commons and House of Lords. It is a type of Parliamentary committee of the United Kingdom.

Permanent joint select committees 

Three permanent joint select committees meet regularly:

Joint Committee on the National Security Strategy
Joint Committee on Human Rights
Joint Committee on Statutory Instruments

Two committees meet as required to scrutinize bills that seek to consolidate existing statutes or to simplify the language of tax laws:

Joint Committee on Consolidation Bills
Joint Committee on Tax Law Rewrite Bills

Temporary joint select committees 

Temporary Joint Select committees are formed to consider either a specific topic or a proposed law (Bill) that requires particular scrutiny.

Former committees have considered the following specific topics:

 Parliamentary Privilege (July 1997 to April 1999)
 House of Lords Reform (July 2002 to May 2003)
 Conventions on the relationship between the two Houses of Parliament (May to November 2006)
 Privacy and Injunctions (July 2011 to March 2012)
 Banking Standards (July 2012 to July 2013)
 Parliamentary Privilege (December 2012 to June 2013)
 Palace of Westminster (July 2015 to September 2016)

Other joint committees

There are two statutory committees whose membership is formed from both the Commons and the Lords:

 Ecclesiastical Committee
 Intelligence and Security Committee of Parliament

In addition, a joint committee advises on the security of the Parliamentary Estate:

Joint Committee on Security

See also 

Joint committee (legislative)
List of joint committees (UK local government)
Parliament of the United Kingdom

External links
Records of the Joint Committees are kept at the Parliamentary Archives

References